The 1943 Newark by-election was held on 8 June 1943.  The by-election was held due to the succession to the peerage of the incumbent Conservative MP, William Cavendish-Bentinck.  It was won by the Conservative candidate Sidney Shephard.

See also
2014 Newark by-election

References

1943 elections in the United Kingdom
1943 in England
20th century in Nottinghamshire
Newark and Sherwood
By-elections to the Parliament of the United Kingdom in Nottinghamshire constituencies